Dust to Dirt is the debut album by alternative rock group Alien Crime Syndicate released in 2000 through Collective Fruit. Following the folding of their previous label, Revolution Records, they relocated to Seattle, Washington and began re-recording songs from the first unreleased record, From the Word Go later released on Will Records, as well as new material released on Nabil Ayers's own label, Collective Fruit, in February, 2000.

Track listing
All songs written by Joe Reineke.

Personnel
Alien Crime Syndicate
Joe Reineke – vocals, guitar
Jason Krevey – guitar, vocals
Jeff Rouse – bass, vocals
Nabil Ayers – drums

Production personnel
Joe Reineke – production, mixing
Jon Ervie – engineering
Jim Devito – mixing
Howie Weinberg – mastering

References

2000 debut albums
Alien Crime Syndicate albums